Buddy goes West (also known as A fist goes West) is a 1981 Spaghetti Western comedy film directed by Michele Lupo.

Plot 
In the Old West, a mysterious man, nicknamed "Doc", arrives in a dusty town. Doc is a bandit who robbed a city physician, keeping his instruments' briefcase. He is misunderstood by local residents for a real doctor, and induced to care in particular for sick children. While treating them, Doc becomes aware that the small town is harassed by a criminal gang that bribes the sheriff. Doc immediately proclaims himself the new sheriff, and proceeds to hunt down the bandits.

Cast 
 Bud Spencer: Buddy
 Amidou: Girolamo  
 Joe Bugner: Sheriff Bronson
 Riccardo Pizzuti: Colorado Slim
 Carlo Reali: Sarto
 Renato Scarpa: Logan
 Sara Franchetti: Witwe Gordon 
 Giovanni Cianfriglia: Jack Bolt
 Nazzareno Zamperla: Slim Henchman (uncredited)

References

External links

1981 films
1980s Western (genre) comedy films
Italian Western (genre) comedy films
Spaghetti Western films
Films scored by Ennio Morricone
Films directed by Michele Lupo
Films shot in Almería
1981 comedy films
Films with screenplays by Sergio Donati
Medical-themed films
1980s Italian-language films
1980s Italian films